Peter Jacob Carter (May 29, 1845 – July 19, 1886) was an American Republican politician who served as a member of the Virginia House of Delegates, representing Northampton County from 1871 to 1879. He was one of the first African-Americans to serve in Virginia's government. He fell ill while traveling via steamboat between Norfolk and the Eastern Shore of Virginia, and died soon thereafter; the cause of his death was likely appendicitis. He was interred in the family cemetery near Franktown. A historic marker in his honor was erected by the Virginia Department of Historic Resources in 2009. It stands in front of Bethel Baptist Church, which had been constructed on land that he had donated.

See also
 African-American officeholders during and following the Reconstruction era

References

External links

 Peter J Carter at Encyclopedia Virginia

1845 births
1886 deaths
African-American politicians during the Reconstruction Era
African-American state legislators in Virginia
Republican Party members of the Virginia House of Delegates
19th-century American politicians
People of Virginia in the American Civil War
People from Eastville, Virginia
United States Army soldiers
Hampton University alumni